Claire-Lise Campion (born 27 July 1951) is a member of the Senate of France. She represents the Essonne department, and is a member of the Socialist Party.

References
Page on the Senate website 

1951 births
Living people
French Senators of the Fifth Republic
Knights of the Ordre national du Mérite
Socialist Party (France) politicians
Women members of the Senate (France)
Senators of Essonne